1DOL (stylized as iDOL) was a 2010 Philippine drama starring Sarah Geronimo, Sam Milby and Coco Martin. That aired on ABS-CBN's Primetime Bida evening block from September 6, 2010, to October 22, 2010, replacing Agua Bendita. The show was directed by Jojo A. Saguin and Ruel S. Bayani.

The show was permanently cancelled on October 22, 2010, garnering only 35 episodes in total before being replaced by Mara Clara.

Episodes

2010

References

1DOL
2010s television-related lists